Charles Page Fletcher (born 25 February 1951) is a Canadian actor who has starred in films and on television. He is best known for his role on the 1980s hit HBO TV series The Hitchhiker as the main title character from 1984–1990 and for playing RoboCop in the TV mini series RoboCop: Prime Directives.

Biography
The son of Ron and Peggy (née Fulton), Fletcher was born and grew up in Bass River, Nova Scotia. His first feature film was in the 1982 horror movie Humongous as Tom Rice. His other films include American Nightmare (1983), Martha, Ruth, & Edie (1988), and Friends, Lovers, & Lunatics (1989).

Page starred in the 2000 TV mini series RoboCop: Prime Directives as Alex Murphy/RoboCop, his most recent project was in the 2002 TV movie Haven't We Met Before?.

Fletcher has made guest appearances on episodes of The Beachcombers, Street Legal, Forever Knight, Lexx, Earth: Final Conflict, and Night Heat.

Filmography

Film

Television

References

External links

1951 births
Living people
Male actors from Nova Scotia
Canadian male film actors
Canadian male television actors
People from Colchester County